Army War College may refer to:

 United States Army War College, in Carlisle, Pennsylvania
 Army War College, Mhow, an institution of the Indian Army in Mhow, Madhya Pradesh
 Army War College (Japan), a former college for officers of the Imperial Japanese Army
 Army War College (Turkey)

See also
 Ecole de Guerre-Terre, France
 War college